Zygogramma continua is a species of beetle belonging to the family Zygogramma.

Taxonomy
There is a single subspecies of Z. continua: Z. continua fasciatipennis.

Description
Z. continua is a small leaf beetle with an orange-brown head and orange-brown pronotum, mottled with yellow at the frontal end. The elytra are pale white or yellow and marked with four continuous, elongated brown stripes. The suture is also brown.

Distribution and Habitat
Z. continua is native to North America, Canada, and Mexico. Both adults and larvae are associated with the false sunflower species showy goldeneye (Heliomeris multiflora).

References

External links

Multiple images of Zygogramma continua

Chrysomelinae
Beetles described in 1868
Beetles of North America
Beetles of Central America